Roxanna may refer to:

 Roxanna, Ohio, US, an unincorporated community
 Roxanne (given name), a feminine given name
 Roxanna (crater), a crater on Venus

See also 
 Roxana (disambiguation)
 Roxanne (disambiguation)
 Rossana (disambiguation)
 Rosanna (disambiguation)